John Sykes was an American football running back. Sykes played college football at Morgan State University, where he broke several rushing records previously held by Pro Football Hall of Famer Leroy Kelly.  In his senior year and Morgan State he rushed for 1007 yards on 193 carries.  That year he was named an honorable mention to the Little All-America college football team and named to the all-MEAC team.

Sykes was drafted by the Baltimore Colts in the 7th round of the 1972 NFL Draft.  After being cut by the Colts before the regular season started he was signed by the St. Louis Cardinals in September.  After not playing in any games for the Cardinals he was cut and then signed by the San Diego Chargers in November 1972 and placed on their taxi squad.  After being activated by the Chargers he played in 2 games for the Chargers, returning two kickoffs for 44 yards.  He returned one kickoff for 24 yards against the Denver Broncos on December 10, 1972, and he returned one kickoff for 20 yards against the Pittsburgh Steelers on December 17.  He was cut by the Chargers during training camp in 1973 and resigned by the Colts, but the Colts also waived him before the season started.  In 1974 he played semi-pro football for the Hanover Rhinos.  In 1975 he played for the Charlotte Hornets of the World Football League but his season was cut short by torn knee ligaments and the league folded during the season.

After leaving professional football, Sykes became a physical education teacher at his alma mater of Baltimore City College and later at Highlandtown Middle School.  Sykes died in 2019 of an apparent stroke at the age of 70.

References

1949 births
2019 deaths
American football running backs
San Diego Chargers players
Players of American football from Baltimore
Charlotte Hornets (WFL) players
Morgan State Bears football players
Baltimore Colts players